Lev Kazimirovich Khrshchonovich (1838-1907), last name also spelled Chrśonowicz, Chrszczonowicz, Hrszczonowicz, Hrśonowicz, and Xrşçonoviç, was the chief architect of Kazan.

He was a son of Minsk architect Kazimierz Chrśonowicz, an ethnic Pole. Khrshchonovich graduated from the Saint Petersburg Architect School in 1859 and was sent to Kazan. In 1874–1882, he was the Chief Architect of the Kazan Governorate, and in 1883–1907 he held the post of the Chief Engineer of the governorate.

Khrshchonovich designed the Lutheran Church (1870s), Alafuzov Theatre (1900), the first stone bridge over Bolaq (1907), and managed the reconstruction of the Rome-Catholic Church (1907). Khrshchonovich was a follower of eclecticism.

He was married to Maria and had a son Leonid, who also became an engineer.

References

Russian architects
1838 births
1907 deaths
Russian people of Polish descent
People from Kazan